Stefan Hofer is a Swiss curler.

Teams

References

External links
 
 Video: 

Living people
Swiss male curlers
World curling champions
Swiss curling champions
Year of birth missing (living people)